The Sundown Playboys are an American Cajun music band in Louisiana, United States.

The band was founded in 1945 by accordionist Lionel Cormier, and has been performing almost continuously throughout the United States.  After the death of Lionel Cormier in the early 1970s, Lesa Cormier decided to carry on the tradition of his father's band.  With the help of two other band members and his own son, the tradition of the Sundown Playboys continues.

Over the years, several accordion players have played in Lionel Cormier's place, but three core members of the group have continued playing.  Lesa Cormier has played drums since the beginning with his father.  He was seventeen when he started.  Wallace "Red" Touchet plays the fiddle and Larry Miller plays the steel guitar.  After leading a band of his own, accordionist August Broussard joined the band in 2000.  In the 1980s, Lesa's son, Danny, joined the band as a bass player and sometimes steel guitar, but now plays steel guitar with Jackie Caillier and the Cajun Cousins.  Danny's son joined the band as bass player.  Brian Cormier is a fourth generation member of the Sundown Playboys.

Trivia

 Former Smiths frontman and solo star, Morrissey, included their song "Saturday Nite Special" (which, notably, was released by The Beatles' Apple Records label) on his Under the Influence album.

External links
 Lesa Cormier and the Sundown Playboys
 Sundown Playboys mp3: Rendezvous Au Bal
 Sundown Playboys mp3: Country Boy Waltz
 "Cajun Music mp3: Hadacol it Something"
 Clarence's Info on Cajun and Zydeco Music and Culture
 The Sundown Playboys on Apple Records (Apple 44)

Apple Records artists
Musical groups established in 1945
Cajun musicians